Victoria Adelaide of Schleswig-Holstein-Sonderburg-Glücksburg (31 December 1885 – 3 October 1970) was Duchess of Saxe-Coburg and Gotha as the consort of Duke Charles Edward from their marriage on 11 October 1905 until his abdication on 14 November 1918. Victoria Adelaide is the maternal grandmother of Carl XVI Gustaf of Sweden. She was a niece of German Empress Augusta Victoria.

Early life

Princess Victoria Adelaide was born on 31 December 1885 at Castle Grünholz, Thumby, Schleswig-Holstein, Prussia as the eldest daughter of Frederick Ferdinand, Duke of Schleswig-Holstein-Sonderburg-Glücksburg and his wife Princess Karoline Mathilde of Schleswig-Holstein-Sonderburg-Augustenburg. Her father was the eldest son of Friedrich, Duke of Schleswig-Holstein-Sonderburg-Glücksburg and a nephew of Christian IX of Denmark. One month before the birth of Victoria Adelaide, he had succeeded to the headship of the House of Schleswig-Holstein-Sonderburg-Glücksburg and the title of duke upon the death of his father on 27 November 1885.

Duchess of Saxe-Coburg and Gotha

On 11 October 1905, at Glücksburg Castle, Schleswig, she married Charles Edward, Duke of Saxe-Coburg and Gotha. Charles Edward was the only son of Prince Leopold, Duke of Albany by his wife Princess Helena of Waldeck and a grandson of Queen Victoria. Five years before the marriage, he had succeeded to the duchy of Saxe-Coburg and Gotha upon the death of his uncle Alfred, Duke of Saxe-Coburg and Gotha in 1900. Victoria Adelaide was described as the leading part in the marriage and the Duke would initially come to her for advice. She and Charles Edward had five children.

Later life

In 1918, the Duke was forced to abdicate his ducal throne, following the end of World War I, forcing the family to become private citizens.

Charles Edward was an early and fervent supporter of Adolf Hitler. Victoria Adelaide initially shared her husband's enthusiasm and patriotism but she came to loathe the Nazi Party following the Nazi seizure of power. She defied her husband by supporting the German Evangelical Church Confederation against the antisemitic German Christians.

After World War II, the couple fled to Austria (where Schloss Greinburg an der Donau had been a Saxe-Coburg property since 1822, and remains such) following the seizure of their properties in East Germany by the Soviet Union. She died at Schloss Greinburg (Grein, Austria) on 3 October 1970 and was buried beside her husband at Schloss Callenberg, Coburg, on 8 October of that year.

Issue

Ancestry

References

|-

1885 births
1970 deaths
Wives of British princes
Victoria Adelaide
Albany
Victoria Adelaide
Victoria Adelaide